Alathyria condola is a species of freshwater river mussel, a bivalve mollusk in the family Hyriidae. This species occurs in coastal rivers in eastern New South Wales, Australia. The type specimen was collected from the Murrumbidgee River.

The mussel is susceptible to bioaccumulation of hazardous levels of toxins from the cyanobacterium Anabaena circinalis which can lead to paralytic shellfish poisoning when eaten.

References

Hyriidae